Roto-Rooter Plumbing & Water Cleanup (formerly called Roto-Rooter Plumbing & Drain Service) is a Cincinnati, Ohio based company providing plumbing repair, sewer and drain services, and water damage cleanup services to residential and commercial customers. Roto-Rooter is a United States company founded in 1935, which originally specialized in clearing tree roots and other obstructions from sewer lines. 

, it employs thousands of plumbers, and service technicians throughout the US and Canada who provide plumbing and sewer and water damage cleanup services. Roto-Rooter also employs manufacturing technicians and assembly workers at its manufacturing plant in West Des Moines, Iowa. The plant manufactures the company's patented, proprietary Roto-Rooter sewer and drain cleaning machines as well as sewer and drain cleaning cables and blades. Roto-Rooter is one of the two subsidiary divisions of the publicly traded Chemed Corporation, of which the other one is a hospice care provider VITAS Healthcare.

History 

In the late 1920s, Samuel Oscar Blanc (1883–1964) was motivated by a stubbornly blocked sewer at his son's (Milton L. Blanc) Des Moines, Iowa, apartment to seek a better solution than digging up the sewer line to remove tree roots that had invaded the underground sewer pipe.

By 1933, Samuel Blanc had fashioned a sewer-cleaning machine from a washing machine motor, wheels from a child's little red wagon, and a 3/8" steel cable. The cable rotated with a sharp C-shaped blade attached to the tip. This rotating motion cut tree roots out of sewer lines, eliminating the tedious and expensive need to dig up pipes and clear obstructions by hand, thus inventing the world's first heavy-duty Plumber's Snake. Blanc's wife, Lettie (née Lettie Jensen), called his invention the "Roto-Rooter".

By the mid-1930s, Blanc was selling his patented "Roto-Rooter" machines for $250 and incorporated a business around it called Roto-Rooter Corporation. Many who were eager for work in the midst of the Great Depression started their own Roto-Rooter businesses throughout the upper Midwest, the Great Plains, and the Northeast. Sewer cleaners are not required to have a plumbing license so in the 1930s a man could earn a decent living with only minor training operating the Roto-Rooter machine and a willingness to advertise his local business. Roto-Rooter's sewer cleaning service allowed homeowners to avoid digging up lawns and landscaping to reach underground sewer pipes. This modern breakthrough was such a revolutionary concept in the 1930s and 40s that Roto-Rooter featured an illustration of a mound of dirt over a recently excavated sewer pipe with the caption, "Why put a grave in your yard?"

In 1939, after his Roto-Rooter sewer cleaning machine proved successful, Sam Blanc designed and built a smaller model that operated on the same principle but could clean and clear bathroom and kitchen sink drains as well as laundry drains and other household plumbing drains. Blanc also built a much larger version of the Roto-Rooter machine called the Roto-Rooter Royal. It had to be towed by a truck and featured a 10-horsepower gasoline engine and 1000 feet of steel cable. It was capable of cleaning large industrial and municipal sewer pipes. An improved version called "The Mainliner" was introduced in 1958 that could also thread telephone cable. It was discontinued in 1973.

In 1980, the Blanc family sold Roto-Rooter Corporation to Cincinnati-based Chemed Corporation. Chemed began purchasing independent Roto-Rooter franchises and operating them as company-owned service locations under the newly formed Roto-Rooter Services Company, whose corporate headquarters is in downtown Cincinnati. Chemed sold off some of its holdings in Roto-Rooter in both 1984 and 1985, bringing its ownership stake to just below 60%, but launched a bid in 1996 to reacquire the 42% of shares that it had earlier sold off.

In the 1980s, some Roto-Rooter franchises and company-owned locations began to offer around-the-clock service and general full-service plumbing repair for both residential and commercial customers. Today, Roto-Rooter's 24-hour plumbing services represent a major part of the company's business. The company has more than 600 service locations operating throughout North America that serve more than 90% of the US population in all fifty states, and more than 40% of the Canadian population. Roto-Rooter is the largest provider of plumbing repair and sewer and drain cleaning services in both countries.

In 2009, Roto-Rooter introduced a book titled Chilling Tales From The Porcelain Seat which featured "true tales of the strange and unexplained things that happen and the Roto-Rooter Heroes that can fix them". Roto-Rooter asked its plumbers throughout North America to submit true stories about the odd things they have encountered on the job such as strange items recovered from toilets and sewer pipes. 
 
International franchise operations have been established in Canada, Japan, the Philippines, Hong Kong, Indonesia, Singapore, Brazil, South Africa, and Australia.

Corporate identity

Original Logo
For the first five years of Roto-Rooter's existence (1935-1940), the company had no official logo and allowed its franchisees to paint their trucks however they saw fit. Due to copycat imitators, Roto-Rooter unveiled the first official Roto-Rooter logo in November 1940. The logo featured the patented Roto-Rooter electric sewer cleaning machine inside of an outline of the United States proclaiming, "A Specialized Service From Coast-to-Coast". The new emblem was used on service vehicles, on guarantees, and in all advertising to help homeowners select the original Roto-Rooter.

1953-1979
In 1953, Roto-Rooter updated the logo to a much simpler design which incorporated a new black and white font with “SEWER-DRAIN SERVICE” inside a drainpipe. This logo was used from 1953 through the 1970s. The only update made to this design was switching out the black outline to a blue outline.

1980-1995
By 1980, Roto-Rooter was in need of an updated logo for its service vans and equipment. The new logo for the 1980s was a refreshed version of the previous logo. The new logo was all blue and eliminated the rightward slant of the previous logo, standing up straight the letters of the Roto-Rooter name. The drainpipe portion was also updated to include more waves.

1996 - Present
In 1996, the Roto-Rooter Visual Identity Program introduced a new logo to replace all previous logos. Variations of this design are still used to this day by Roto-Rooter locations in the United States, Canada, and around the world. The only variation since its introduction was the addition of a single-line logo to complement the over-and-under version. Since the single-line logo uses the same font, it is considered an extension of the other logo.

Advertising

Razor-Kleen!
In the 1930s and 1940s, Roto-Rooter service vehicles bore the slogan "Roto-Rooter's patented cutting blades slice through roots and cut them away ... Razor-Kleen!"

And away go troubles down the drain
The Roto-Rooter advertising jingle used today on TV and radio was created in 1954 and has been one of the longest-running and best-remembered musical jingles in history:

Call Roto-Rooter, that's the name, and away go troubles down the drain.

The memorable bass voice in the commercial was that of Tom Fouts, more widely known as Captain Stubby of Captain Stubby and the Buccaneers.

Many memorable Roto-Rooter TV commercials were introduced over the years that featured the iconic Roto-Rooter advertising jingle, helping to make it a familiar piece of Americana.

We do both!
In December 2017, Roto-Rooter released a TV commercial that introduced a new slogan, "We Do Both", to explain to the public that Roto-Rooter does both plumbing repair and water damage cleanup. The commercial, which began airing on television and in targeted internet ads, features a nosy neighbor asking a Roto-Rooter plumber standing at the curb "what are you doing with the Johnsons' sofa?" The Roto-Rooter plumber explains that the Johnsons had a pipe break that flooded their house and that he had fixed the broken pipe and now Roto-Rooter is "cleaning up the damage".

Yeah, We Do That Too!
As a follow-up to “We Do Both”, in August of 2019 Roto-Rooter premiered a sequel slogan campaign titled “We Do That Too” to showcase service options that go beyond the core services of plumbing repair, drain cleaning, and water damage clean-up. The “We Do That Too” campaign highlights the secondary services that Roto-Rooter offers such as pipe inspection, sewer repair, water heater repair, and sump pump replacement.

References

External links
 
 
 

Plumbing
American companies established in 1935
Retail companies established in 1935
Cleaning companies of the United States
American inventions
Companies based in Cincinnati